Scrobipalpa portosanctana is a moth of the family Gelechiidae. It was described by Henry Tibbats Stainton in 1859. It is found in Spain, France, Italy, Croatia, as well as on Sardinia, Corsica, Sicily, Malta and Madeira. It is also present in North Africa and the Near East.

The larvae feed on Lycium barbarum and Lycium europaeum. They mine the leaves of their host plant. They have a grey body with dark length lines and a blackish head.

References

External links

Moths described in 1859
Scrobipalpa
Moths of Europe